Farhad Moshiri (born 18 May 1955) is a British-Iranian businessman based in Monaco. He is the chairman and a shareholder of USM, a diversified Russian holding company with significant interests across the metals and mining, telecoms, technology and internet sectors. Moshiri is also the majority owner of Premier League football club Everton.

Early life
Moshiri was born in the Imperial State of Iran, and his parents left just before the 1979 revolution. His father, Majid, (1926–2020) was an army doctor who trained as a pathologist and later became a senior military judge and his mother's family owned Iran's leading publishing house, Kayhan. He studied economics and statistics at University College London, and subsequently qualified in the UK as a chartered certified accountant.

Career
Moshiri worked for various professional services firms including Ernst & Young (1979–1985), Pannell Kerr Forster (1985–1987) and Deloitte & Touche (1987–1992), latterly as a senior manager in Deloitte's audit division. Between 1993 and 2006, he served as Executive Director of GNE Group plc and later served as Chief Executive Officer of Europe Steel Limited (formerly Europe Steel plc) from 2000 to 2008. Between 2006 and 2013, he served as the chairman of Metalloinvest, following which he was appointed as chairman of USM Holdings.

Arsenal
Moshiri and longstanding business partner Alisher Usmanov were co-owners of Red & White Holdings, which bought 14.65% of the shares in Arsenal F.C. from former club vice-chairman David Dein in August 2007. On 18 September 2007, Red and White Holdings increased their stake in Arsenal to 21%, and on 28 September 2007 to 23%, a week after Moshiri announced that he wanted at least a 25% holding in the football club. As of June 2012, Red and White Holdings have acquired at least 29.72%. Arsenal managing director Keith Edelman told BBC Radio 5 Live, "They've said previously they are not going to make a bid for the company and they want to be long-term shareholders."

Everton
In February 2016 it was announced that Moshiri had sold his stake in Arsenal Football Club to Red & White Holdings partner Usmanov in a bid to raise capital required to launch a takeover at Everton F.C. On 27 February, the club officially confirmed Moshiri's purchase of a 49.9% stake in the club, which was ratified two weeks later by the Premier League. In January 2022, Moshiri increased his shares in the club to 94%.

Personal life
Moshiri lives in Monaco. His former wife Nazenin Ansari is a London-based Iranian journalist, managing editor of Kayhan London, a weekly Persian-language newspaper, and series producer at Manoto, an international free-to-air Persian language TV channel. They have two children.

According to the Sunday Times Rich List in 2021, Moshiri has an estimated net worth £1.7bn.

References

1955 births
Living people
Alumni of University College London
Arsenal F.C. directors and chairmen
British expatriates in Monaco
English football chairmen and investors
English people of Iranian descent
Everton F.C. directors and chairmen
Iranian billionaires
Iranian businesspeople
Iranian emigrants to the United Kingdom
Iranian football chairmen and investors
Businesspeople of Iranian descent